Vietnam participated at the 2018 Summer Youth Olympics in Buenos Aires, Argentina from 6 October to 18 October 2018.

Competitors

Medalists

Athletics 

Lê Tiến Long and Đoàn Thu Hằng qualified.
Boys

Girls

Badminton

Vietnam qualified two players based on the Badminton Junior World Rankings. 

Singles

Team

Boxing

Vietnam qualified one boxer based on its performance at the 2017 Youth Women’s World Boxing Championships.

Đỗ Hồng Ngọc was disqualified.

Dancesport

Vietnam qualified one dancer based on its performance at the 2018 World Youth Breaking Championship. 

 B-Boys - B4 (Lê Minh Hiếu)

Gymnastics

Artistic
Nguyễn Văn Khánh Phong and Phạm Như Phương qualified on their performance at the 2018 Junior Artistic Asian Championships, Indonesia.

 Boys' artistic individual all-around - Nguyễn Văn Khánh Phong
 Girls' artistic individual all-around - Phạm Như Phương

Swimming 

 Nguyễn Huy Hoàng, Phạm Thành Bảo and Vũ Thị Phương Anh qualified.

Taekwondo 

Girl

Weightlifting 
Main article: Weightlifting at the 2018 Summer Youth Olympics

Vietnam qualified one athele (girl) based on its performance at the 2017 Youth World Weightlifting Championships.

Boy

Girls

References

2018 in Vietnamese sport
Nations at the 2018 Summer Youth Olympics
Vietnam at the Youth Olympics